The Dunedin Double EP was a seminal record in New Zealand music. An unusual format, it contain two 45rpm 12" discs, and at nearly 50 minutes length, it is longer than many albums.

Released in March 1982 the compilation was one of the first releases from the newly formed Flying Nun Records label (catalogue number DUN-1), which over the course of the next ten years was to become the biggest independent record label in New Zealand. Many of the label's top groups came from the South Island city of Dunedin, and established that southern city's music scene as the leading source of guitar-based bands in New Zealand throughout much of the decade. The bands from the city which had music released on Flying Nun were grouped under the loose banner of Dunedin sound, and several of them went on to not only national but also international success.

Dunedin Double established the names of four of these groups, each of which was represented on the double EP by one side. The four bands concerned were The Chills, Sneaky Feelings, The Stones, and The Verlaines. The Chills' song "Kaleidoscope World" in particular became very popular, gaining considerable airplay for the band (It later provided the title for the band's first album, a compilation of their early singles and EP tracks.

Though the sound quality of the Dunedin Double EP was distinctly lo-fi (it was recorded on portable 4-track by Chris Knox and Doug Hood), the release of this record provided a major impetus both for Flying Nun records and for the four bands involved, as well as providing inspiration and momentum to the music scene in Dunedin.

Track listing

EP 1
Side 1 The Chills
"Kaleidoscope World"
"Satin Doll"
"(Frantic) Drift"
Side 2 Sneaky Feelings
"Pity's Sake"
"There's a Chance"
"Backroom"

EP 2
Side 1 The Stones
"Down and Around"
"See Red"
"Something New"
"Surf's Up"
Side 2 The Verlaines
"Angela"
"Crisis After Crisis"
"You Cheat Yourself Of Everything That Moves"

References

External links 
Stylus Magazine: "In Love With Those Times — Flying Nun and the New Zealand Sound", by Dave McGonigle, April 11, 2005

1982 EPs
The Stones (band) albums
1982 compilation albums
Rock compilation albums
Rock EPs
Flying Nun Records compilation albums
Flying Nun Records EPs
The Chills
Dunedin Sound albums